Housekeeper may refer to:

 Housekeeper (domestic worker), a person heading up domestic maintenance
 "House Keeper" (song), 1996 song by Men of Vizion
 Maid, a female with various domestic duties
 Janitor, a person responsible for institutional maintenance
 A person engaged in housekeeping

See also
 Housekeeping (disambiguation)